Qatur District is in Khoy County, West Azerbaijan province, Iran. At the 2006 National Census, its population was 24,407 in 4,339 households. The following census in 2011 counted 26,583 people in 5,700 households. At the latest census in 2016, the district had 24,591 inhabitants in 5,838 households.

References 

Khoy County

Districts of West Azerbaijan Province

Populated places in West Azerbaijan Province

Populated places in Khoy County